My Prairie Home may refer to

 My Prairie Home (album), a 2013 album by Rae Spoon
 My Prairie Home (film), a 2013 documentary film about Rae Spoon